The Middelplaats mine is a mine located in the west of South Africa in Northern Cape. Middelplaats represents one of the largest manganese reserve in South Africa having estimated reserves of 52 million tonnes of manganese ore grading 38% manganese metal.

See also 
 List of mines in South Africa

References 

Manganese mines in South Africa
Economy of the Northern Cape